Jean-Séraphin M'Bessa Akono (born 5 August 1983 in Yaoundé) is a Cameroonian former professional footballer who played as a striker.

References

1983 births
Living people
Association football forwards
Cameroonian footballers
Racing Club de France Football players
Ligue 2 players
Tonnerre Yaoundé players
Levallois SC players
Pacy Ménilles RC players
US Quevilly-Rouen Métropole players
AC Arlésien players
R.F.C. Seraing (1922) players
Paris FC players
US Orléans players
US Sénart-Moissy players
Royale Union Saint-Gilloise players
Entente SSG players
Cameroonian expatriate footballers
Cameroonian expatriate sportspeople in France
Expatriate footballers in France
Cameroonian expatriate sportspeople in Belgium
Expatriate footballers in Belgium